Treewadee Yongphan (born 3 March 1987) is a Thai sprinter specialising in the 400 metres. She won several medals at regional level.

International competitions

Personal bests

Outdoor
400 metres – 53.11 (Naypiydaw 2013)
800 metres – 2:11.48 (Khon Kaen 2012)
Indoor
400 metres – 54.98 (Hanoi 2009)

References

External links 
 

1987 births
Living people
Treewadee Yongphan
Athletes (track and field) at the 2010 Asian Games
Athletes (track and field) at the 2014 Asian Games
Southeast Asian Games medalists in athletics
Treewadee Yongphan
Treewadee Yongphan
Competitors at the 2009 Southeast Asian Games
Competitors at the 2011 Southeast Asian Games
Competitors at the 2013 Southeast Asian Games
Competitors at the 2015 Southeast Asian Games
Competitors at the 2017 Southeast Asian Games
Treewadee Yongphan
Treewadee Yongphan